Amasis may refer to:

 Amasis I, Pharaoh of Egypt in 1550–1525 BC
 Amasis II, Pharaoh of Egypt in 570–526 BC
 Amasis (Persian general), Achaemenid military commander in Egypt in ca. 525 BC
 Amasis Painter, ancient Greek vase painter of the black figure style
 Amasis (wrestler), American professional wrestler